= Katara, Bhopal =

Katara Katara Hills
- village
- Location within Madhya Pradesh Location within India
- Coordinates: 23.179629°N 77.489276°E
- Country: India
- State: Madhya Pradesh
- District: Bhopal
- Tehsil: Huzur

Population (2011)
  - Total: 3,153
- Time zone: UTC+5:30 (IST)
- ISO 3166 code: MP-IN
- Census code: 482549

Katara is a village in the Bhopal district of Madhya Pradesh, India. It is located in the Huzur tehsil and the Phanda block.

== Demographics ==
According to the 2011 census of India, Katara has 710 households. The effective literacy rate (i.e. the literacy rate of population excluding children aged 6 and below) is 80.92%.

Demographics (2011 Census)
	Total	Male	Female
Population	3153	1643	1510
Children aged below 6 years	433	227	206
Scheduled caste	627	335	292
Scheduled tribe	323	172	151
Literates	2201	1214	987
Workers (all)	1326	925	401
Main workers (total)	1241	872	369
Main workers: Cultivators	97	82	15
Main workers: Agricultural labourers	29	19	10
Main workers: Household industry workers	2	1	1
Main workers: Other	1113	770	343
Marginal workers (total)	85	53	32
Marginal workers: Cultivators	11	7	4
Marginal workers: Agricultural labourers	7	3	4
Marginal workers: Household industry workers	3	1	2
Marginal workers: Others	64	42	22
Non-workers	1827	718	1109
